Dineen (Irish: Ó Duinnín) is an Irish surname. People with the surname include:

Bill Dineen (1932–2016), professional ice hockey player and head coach
Bobby Dineen, Irish sportsperson
Carolyn Dineen King (born 1938), judge of the United States Court of Appeals for the Fifth Circuit
David Dineen-Porter, actor, comedian and musician from Toronto, Canada
Donal Dineen, Irish radio presenter, photographer, film maker and former television presenter
Gary Dineen (1943–2006), Canadian Olympian and top developer of hockey talent in the Springfield area
Gord Dineen (born 1962), coach in professional ice hockey and retired NHL defenceman
Hannah Dineen, former camogie player, captain of the All Ireland Camogie Championship winning team in 1972
James Owen Dineen (1920–1975), Canadian engineer and university administrator
Kerry Dineen (born 1952), former Major League Baseball outfielder
Kevin Dineen (born 1963), retired professional ice hockey player, former head coach of the Portland Pirates, assistant coach of Chicago Blackhawks
Molly Dineen (born 1959), BAFTA and Royal Television Society award-winning UK television documentary director, cinematographer and producer
Patricia Dineen (1936–1961), American figure skater who competed in ice dancing with her husband Robert Dineen
Patrick Dineen (born 1938), former Irish cricketer
Patrick S. Dinneen (1860–1934), a leading figure in the Gaelic revival
Peter Dineen (born 1960), Canadian-born and Seattle, Washington-raised professional ice hockey defenseman who played in the National Hockey League
Robert Dineen (1937–1961), American figure skater who competed in ice dancing with his wife Patricia Dineen
Seán Dineen (born 1944), Irish mathematician specialising in complex analysis

See also
Dannen
Dennen (disambiguation)
Dinneen
Deneen

Anglicised Irish-language surnames